Mohamed Hendouf (born 15 June 1990) is a Belgian-Moroccan kickboxer, currently competing in the lightweight division of Glory.

Biography and career

Early career
Hendouf started Kickboxing at 20 years old and became pro only 2 years later in August 2013 winning his debut fight with an impressive high kick knockout against Soufiane Mouelhi.

Hendouf faced Olivier Lagarigue at the January 21, 2017 La Nuit Des Gladiateurs event, in his first fight of the year. He won the fight by decision. Hendouf next faced the two-weight WAKO world champion Chingiz Allazov at Victory – ACB KB9: Showdown in Paris on March 25, 2017. He lost the fight by unanimous decision. Hendouf faced Bilal Loukili at La Nuit Des Titans 4 on May 13, 2017, in his third fight of the year. He won the fight by decision. Hendouf faced Abdellah Ezbiri at Tiger Night on September 4, 2017. He lost the fight by decision.

Hendouf made his Glory of Heroes debut against Han Wenbao at Glory of Heroes: Chengdu on January 6, 2018. He won the fight by decision. Hendouf was then booked to face Tie Yinghua for the vacant Glory of Heroes]-67kg title at Glory of Heroes: Guangzhou on January 13, 2018. He lost the fight by decision, after an extra round was fought.

After failing to capture the Glory of Heroes title, Hendouf returned to the French kickboxing circuit, where he first faced Sayfullah Khambakhadov at the March 17, 2018, La Nuit Des Titans event. He won the fight by decision. Hendouf was next booked to face Charles Francois at The Main Event 6 on March 30, 2018. He won the fight by a first-round knockout. Hendouf extended his winning streak to four fights with decision victories against Yvan Naccari at Le Choc Des Gladiateurs on July 22, 2018 and Andrei Ostrovanu at World Fighting League on September 22, 2018.

Hendouf was booked to fight a rematch with Chingiz Allazov for the NDC lightweight title at  November 24, 2018 Nuit Des Champions event. He lost the fight by unanimous decision.

Hendouf took part in the 2018 TKR lightweight tournament. He faced Wilson Varela in the semifinal bout of the one-day tournament, which took place on December 22, 2018. Hendouf won the fight by split decision and advanced to the tournament finals, where he faced Mathieu Tavares. Hendouf beat Tavares by a second-round technical knockout.

Hendouf participated in the 2019 World Fighting League lightweight tournament, which took place on February 18, 2019. He won both his quarterfinal bout against Mohamed Soumah and semifinal bout against Younes Smaili by a first-round stoppage. These two victories earned Hendouf a place in the tournament finals, where he faced Wail Karroumi. He won the fight by decision, after an extra rounds was fought.

Hendouf was booked to face Tayfun Özcan for the inagurual Arena Fight 72kg kickboxing title at the August 6, 2019 Arena Fight event. He lost the fight by unanimous decision.

Hendouf faced Claudio Ivaldi at Le Choc Des Gladiateurs on July 20, 2019. He won the fight by decision.

Glory
Hendouf made his Glory debut against Guerric Billet at Glory 70: Lyon on October 26, 2019. He won the fight by split decision.

Hendouf was next booked to face Bruno Gazani at Glory 75: Utrecht on February 29, 2020. He lost the fight by split decision.

Hendouf made his third Glory appearance against Robson Minotinho at Glory 78: Arnhem on September 4, 2021. He won the fight by a third-round knockout.

Titles and accomplishments

Professional

 2015 Partouche Kickboxing Tournament Champion

 2018 TKR Tournament Champion

 2019 World Fighting League -70kg Champion

Kickboxing record

|- 
|- style="background:#cfc;"
| 2022-05-22 || Win ||align=left| Mikel Sortino || Alpha Fight League || Bruxelles, Belgium || Decision || 3 || 3:00

|- 
|- style="background:#cfc;"
| 2021-09-04 || Win ||align=left| Robson Minotinho || Glory 78: Arnhem || Arnhem, Netherlands || KO (Left hook to the body) || 3 || 1:30

|-
|- style="background:#fbb;"
|  2020-02-29 || Loss || align="left" | Bruno Gazani || Glory 75: Utrecht || Utrecht, Netherlands ||Decision (Split) || 3 || 3:00

|- style="background:#cfc;"
| 2019-10-26 || Win ||align=left| Guerric Billet || Glory 70: Lyon || Lyon, France || Decision (Split) || 3|| 3:00

|- style="background:#cfc;"
| 2019-07-20 || Win ||align=left| Claudio Ivaldi || Le Choc Des Gladiateurs || France || Decision || 3|| 3:00

|- style="background:#fbb;"
| 2019-06-08 || Loss ||align=left| Tayfun Özcan || Arena Fight || France || Decision (Unanimous) || 5 || 3:00
|-
! style=background:white colspan=9 |

|- style="background:#cfc;"
| 2019-02-18 || Win ||align=left| Wail Karroumi || World Fighting League, Final || Netherlands || Extra Round Decision   || 4 || 3:00 
|-
! style=background:white colspan=9 |

|- style="background:#cfc;"
| 2019-02-18 || Win ||align=left| Younes Smaili || World Fighting League, Semi Final || Netherlands || TKO  || 1 ||

|- style="background:#cfc;"
| 2019-02-18 || Win ||align=left| Mohamed Soumah || World Fighting League, Quarter Final || Netherlands || KO  || 1 ||

|- style="background:#cfc;"
| 2018-12-22 || Win ||align=left| Mathieu Tavares || TKR, Final || France || TKO (Referee Stoppage) || 3 || 3:00

|- style="background:#cfc;"
| 2018-12-22 || Win ||align=left| Wilson Varela || TKR, Semi Final || France || Decision (Split) || 3 || 3:00

|- style="background:#fbb;" 
|| 2018-11-24|| Loss|| style="text-align:left;"| Chingiz Allazov|| Nuit Des Champions|| France || Decision (Unanimous) || 5 || 3:00
|-
! style=background:white colspan=9 |

|- style="background:#cfc;"
| 2018-09-22 || Win ||align=left| Andrei Ostrovanu || World Fighting League|| France || Decision || 3 || 3:00

|- style="background:#cfc;"
| 2018-07-22 || Win ||align=left| Yvan Naccari || Le Choc Des Gladiateurs|| France || Decision || 3 || 3:00

|- style="background:#cfc;"
| 2018-03-30 || Win ||align=left| Charles Francois || The Main Event 6|| France || TKO || 2 ||

|- style="background:#cfc;"
| 2018-03-17 || Win ||align=left| Khambakhadov Saifullah || La Nuit Des Titans || France || Decision || 3 || 3:00

|- style="background:#fbb;"
| 2018-01-13 || Loss ||align=left| Tie Yinghua || Glory of Heroes: Guangzhou|| Guangzhou, China || Extra Round Decision || 4 || 3:00
|-
! style=background:white colspan=9|

|- style="background:#cfc;"
| 2018-01-06 || Win ||align=left| Han Wenbao || Glory of Heroes: Chengdu|| Chengdu, China || Decision || 3 || 3:00

|- style="background:#cfc;"
| 2017-09-23 || Win ||align=left| Jimmy Vienot|| Extreme Fight For Heroes 5 || France || Decision || 3 || 3:00

|-  style="background:#fbb;"
| 2017-09-04|| Loss ||align=left| Abdellah Ezbiri || Tiger Night || Switzerland || Decision|| 3 || 3:00

|- style="background:#cfc;"
| 2017-05-13 || Win|| style="text-align:left;"| Bilal Loukili || La Nuit Des Titans 4|| France|| Decision || 3||  3:00

|- style="background:#fbb;"
| 2017-03-25 || Loss|| style="text-align:left;"| Chingiz Allazov || Victory – ACB KB9: Showdown in Paris|| Paris, France|| Decision (Unanimous) || 3|| 3:00

|- style="background:#cfc;"
| 2017-01-21 || Win|| style="text-align:left;"| Olivier Lagarigue || La Nuit Des Gladiateurs|| France|| Decision || 3||  3:00

|- style="background:#cfc;"
| 2016-12-17|| Win||align=left| Tie Yinghua || Rise of Heroes 5 || Nanning, China  || Decision (Split) || 3 || 3:00

|- style="background:#fbb;"
| 2016-10-08 || Loss|| style="text-align:left;"| Mohamed Houmer || World GBC Tour 11|| France|| Decision || 3||  3:00

|- style="background:#cfc;"
| 2016-06-03 || Win|| style="text-align:left;"| Antonio Gomez || Phenix Boxing Only Edition 4|| France|| Decision || 3||  3:00

|- style="background:#c5d2ea;"
| 2016-05-14 || Draw|| style="text-align:left;"| Mohamed Diaby || La Nuit des Titans III|| France|| Decision || 3||  3:00

|- style="background:#cfc;"
| 2016-03-26 || Win|| style="text-align:left;"| Eddy Blaise || Best of Fight 3|| France|| Decision || 3||  3:00

|- style="background:#fbb;"
| 2016-03-26 || Loss|| style="text-align:left;"| Ceric De Kersmaeker || Test of the best|| Belgium|| Decision || 3||  3:00

|- style="background:#cfc;"
| 2016-03-19 || Win|| style="text-align:left;"| Julien Souve || The Warriors|| France|| Decision || 3||  3:00

|- style="background:#cfc;"
| 2016-02-20 || Win|| style="text-align:left;"| Aydin Tuncay|| 12eme Nuit des Champions|| France|| Decision || 3||  3:00

|- style="background:#cfc;"
| 2015-12-19 || Win|| style="text-align:left;"| Yasin Demir || Fights At The Border|| Belgium|| Decision || 3||  3:00

|- style="background:#fbb;"
| 2015-10-15 || Loss|| style="text-align:left;"| Edouard Bernadou || Partouche Kickboxing Tour, Semi Final|| France|| Extra Round Decision || 4||  3:00

|- style="background:#cfc;"
| 2015-05-09 || Win|| style="text-align:left;"| Majid Doudah || The Night of no Return|| Belgium||  Decision || 3||  3:00

|- style="background:#cfc;"
| 2015-04-16 || Win|| style="text-align:left;"| Christophe Pruvost || Partouche Kickboxing Tour, Final || France|| Extra Round Decision || 4||  3:00

|- style="background:#cfc;"
| 2015-04-16 || Win|| style="text-align:left;"| Mehmet Karabuk || Partouche Kickboxing Tour, Semi Final || France|| Decision || 3||  3:00

|- style="background:#fbb;"
| 2014-02-15 || Loss|| style="text-align:left;"| Jérémy Ragazzacci || World GBC Tour 6 || France|| Decision || 3||  3:00
|- style="background:#cfc;"

| 2013-06-08 || Win|| style="text-align:left;"| Soufiane Mouelhi|| K1 EVENTS 5 || Troyes, France|| KO (High Kick)|| 3|| 
|-
| colspan=9 | Legend:

See also
List of male kickboxers

References

Living people
Belgian male kickboxers
1991 births
People from Berkane
Glory kickboxers